Double crossover may refer to:

 Two pairs of railway switches forming two connections that cross over between two parallel tracks
 An artificial nucleic acid structural motif used in DNA nanotechnology